Closteriopsis is a genus of green algae in the family Chlorellaceae.

References

External links

Trebouxiophyceae genera
Chlorellaceae